Troy Brown (born 1971) is an American football coach and former player.

Troy Brown may also refer to:

 Troy Brown (basketball, born 1971), American former basketball player
 Troy Brown Jr. (born 1999), American basketball player
 Troy Brown (footballer) (born 1990), Welsh footballer
 Troy E. Brown (born 1971), American politician in Louisiana

See also
Troy Browns, defunct baseball team